LWC may refer to:
 Last White Christmas, Italian punk/hard core festival
 Lawrence Municipal Airport (Kansas), IATA code
 Liquid water content of a cloud
Cloud liquid water content of a cloud
 Local Weightlifting Committee in USA Weightlifting
 Lord Wandsworth College, Hampshire, England
Louder with Crowder, the name of the show of a popular conservative comedian and political commentator.
 Lutheran Women's Caucus, US
 Language of Wider Communication, the lingua franca of a region.